Kaadhali is a 2017 Telugu-language film directed by Pattabhi R Chilukuri in his directorial debut. The film stars debutant Pooja Doshi, Harish Kalyan and Sai Ronak in the lead roles and marks the Telugu lead film debut of Kalyan.

Plot 
The film is a triangular love story in which a girl, Bandhavi (Pooja Doshi), has to decide between two boys Karthik (Harish Kalyan) and Kranti (Sai Ronak).

Cast
Pooja Doshi as Bandhavi Varadharajan
Harish Kalyan as Karthikeyan "Karthik"
Sai Ronak as Kranti 
Dr. Sharmila as Bandhavi's mother
Sandhya Janak  as Karthik's mother
Pallavi  
Mohan Raman
Gururaj Manepalli
Sudarshan
Bhadram

Production
Director Pattabhi felt telling a story from a girl's point of view would be a good idea after his friends and family told him how films that featured a leading lady ran well. Harish Kalyan was roped in to be part of the cast after Pattabhi watched Kalyan's Vil Ambu. Debutant Pooja Doshi and Sai Ronak were cast after they auditioned for their respective roles. Pooja Doshi plays a Tamil girl in the film, so a Tamil title was chosen for the film.

Soundtrack 
The music was composed by Prasan Praveen Shyam.

Release
This film received mixed reviews upon release.

Sangeetha Devi Dundoo of The Hindu stated that "A little more depth in characters would have helped this simple film from getting sluggish", but praised Harish Kalyan's performance stating that he  "plays his part with maturity. This Tamil actor makes a promising entry into Telugu cinema". Ch Sushil Rao of The Times of India stated that "Nothing particularly great about the movie to suggest not to miss it", but also praised the performances of Kalyan and Sai Ronak and the film's music.

References

External links 
 

2017 films
2010s Telugu-language films
Indian buddy drama films
Indian romantic drama films
2017 romantic drama films
2017 directorial debut films
2010s buddy drama films